Carl Marinus Jensen (13 September 1882 – 4 April 1942) was a Danish sport wrestler who competed in the 1908 Summer Olympics. He won a bronze medal in the Greco-Roman light heavyweight class. He also participated in the Greco-Roman super heavyweight competition but was eliminated in the first round.

References

External links
 

1882 births
1942 deaths
Olympic wrestlers of Denmark
Wrestlers at the 1908 Summer Olympics
Danish male sport wrestlers
Olympic bronze medalists for Denmark
Olympic medalists in wrestling
Medalists at the 1908 Summer Olympics
People from Brønderslev Municipality
Sportspeople from the North Jutland Region